Ogden is a municipality of about 750 people in Memphrémagog Regional County Municipality in the Estrie region of Quebec, Canada. It includes the hamlets of Tomifobia (formerly Smith's Mills) and Graniteville.

Demographics

Population
Population trend:

Language
Mother tongue (2011)

See also 
 List of municipalities in Quebec

References

External links

Municipalities in Quebec
Incorporated places in Estrie